An Angolan passport is a travel document issued to citizens of Angola to facilitate international travel.  Passports are issued by the Migration and Foreigners Services (Serviços de Migração e Estrangeiros) office in Luanda.  Passports issued by the previous issuing body, the National Directorate of Emigration and Borders of Angola (Dnefa), became invalid on April 19, 2001.

As of 1 January 2017, Angolan citizens had visa-free or visa on arrival access to 45 countries and territories, ranking the Angolan passport 90th in terms of travel freedom (tied with Cameroonian and Vietnamese passports) according to the Henley visa restrictions index.

See also
Visa requirements for Angolan citizens

References

Angola
Government of Angola